Fascinus is a genus of sea snails, marine gastropod mollusks in the superfamily Buccinoidea.

Species
Species within the genus Fascinus include:
 Fascinus typicus Hedley, 1903

References

 Fraussen, K. (2010). Buccinidae checklist. Pers. Com.

Buccinoidea (unassigned)
Monotypic gastropod genera